"Gone with the Wind" is a popular song. The music was written by Allie Wrubel, the lyrics by Herb Magidson. The song was published in 1937.  A version recorded by Horace Heidt and his Brigadiers was a No. 1 song in 1937.

Inspiration
Whether the title of this song was related in any way to the 1936 Margaret Mitchell novel Gone with the Wind is difficult to determine. The timing of the song's release suggests something more than coincidence, given that the book received enormous publicity in 1937, dominating the bestseller lists and winning a Pulitzer Prize. Still, the lyrics of the song have no obvious connection to the subject matter of the novel. This song should not be confused with any of the well-known music featured in the 1939 film adaptation of the book.

Recordings
Lennie Hayton & His Orchestra; Vocal Chorus by Paul Barry – Decca 1341-A (62320) (1937)
Horace Heidt & his Brigaders; Vocal Chorus by Larry Cotton – Brunswick 7913 (B 21260) (1937)
Dick Jurgens & His Orchestra; Vocal Chorus by Eddy Howard – (1937–39)
Roy Fox & His Orchestra; Vocal Chorus by Denny Dennis – HMV (1938)
Billie Holiday – Music For Torching (1955)
Julie London – Julie Is Her Name (1955)
Rita Reys – The Cool Voice of Rita Reys (1956)
Art Tatum with Ben Webster – The Tatum Group Masterpieces, Volume Eight (1956 – 3 takes on CD issue)
Doris Day – Day By Day (1957)
Frank Sinatra – Frank Sinatra Sings for Only the Lonely (1958)
Sarah Vaughan – Vaughan And Violins (1958)
Andy Williams – Lonely Street (1959)
Dave Brubeck – Gone with the Wind (1959)
Art Pepper – Intensity (1960)
Wes Montgomery – The Incredible Jazz Guitar of Wes Montgomery (1960)
Ella Fitzgerald – Ella in Berlin: Mack the Knife (1960) (reissue 1993)
Connie Francis – Songs to a Swinging Band (1960)
Anthony Newley – Love is a Now and Then Thing (1960)
The Duprees – (single, #89 pop, 1963)
Bill Evans – California Here I Come (1967)
Kiri Te Kanawa – Blue Skies (1985)
Rob Wasserman with Dan Hicks – Duets (1988)
Sun Ra – Blue Delight (1989)
Derek Bailey – Ballads (2002)
NRBQ – Keep This Love Goin' (2011)

Televised performances
Jim Henson (as Muppet character Guy Smiley) – Sesame Street (1969)
 The Jascha Lombardi Orchestra, on "The Weather Show" – Sesame Street (1972)
Jim Nabors – The Muppet Show (1976)

References

"Gone with the Wind" at jazzstandards.com

1937 songs
Songs with music by Allie Wrubel
Songs with lyrics by Herb Magidson
Andy Williams songs